This is a list of the members of the Australian House of Representatives in the Third Australian Parliament, which was elected on 12 December 1906.

In 1909 the Anti-Socialist Party (previously Free Trade) and most of the Protectionist Party merged to become the Commonwealth Liberal Party.

Notes

* These candidates were elected unopposed.
† These Divisions were created at the 1906 redistribution.

  The Anti-Socialists were known as the Free Trade Party before the 1906 election. In 1909, the Anti-Socialists, the Protectionists and the Western Australia Party merged to form the Commonwealth Liberal Party.
  In 1908 the Labor Party became officially known as the Australian Labour Party (ALP).
  Thomas Brown was first elected in 1901 to the Division of Canobolas, which was abolished at the 1906 redistribution.
  John Chanter rejected the Commonwealth Liberal Party merger and joined the ALP.
  There was no national Protectionist Party organisation in 1906. Members categorised as "Protectionist" were those who accepted the leadership of Alfred Deakin.
  George Fairbairn was endorsed by the Anti-Socialists, but campaigned as an independent Protectionist. He did not sit with the Anti-Socialists.
  The two Western Australia Party members were considered to be independent conservatives.
  James Fowler defected from the ALP to the Commonwealth Liberal Party at the time of the merger.
  Frederick Holder died in 1909. He was replaced at a by-election on 28 August 1909 by Richard Foster a Commonwealth Liberal Party candidate.
  Charles Kingston died in 1908. He was replaced at a by-election on 13 June 1908 by Ernest Roberts, a Labor candidate.
  Sir William Lyne rejected the Commonwealth Liberal Party merger and became an independent.
  Samuel Mauger was first elected in 1901 to the Division of Melbourne Ports, which was abolished at the 1906 redistribution.
  In 1907 Albert Palmer's election was declared void. He was re-elected in a by-election on 10 July 1907.
  John Quick was endorsed by the Anti-Socialists, but sat as an independent.
  Sydney Sampson was endorsed by the Anti-Socialists, but sat as an independent.
  David Storrer rejected the Commonwealth Liberal Party merger and became an independent.
  Chris Watson was first elected in 1901 to the Division of Bland, which was abolished at the 1906 redistribution.
  George Wise rejected the Commonwealth Liberal Party merger and became an independent.

Members of Australian parliaments by term
20th-century Australian politicians